"This Is the Moment" is a major song from the musical Jekyll & Hyde. It was written by Frank Wildhorn and Leslie Bricusse. The song was first performed in the musical by cast member Chuck Wagner as Jekyll & Hyde at the Alley Theatre in Houston in May 1990. Prior to the stage production, a studio version was already released in March 1990 on a concept album titled Highlights from Jekyll & Hyde, performed by Colm Wilkinson.

Actors from the Broadway production like Robert Cuccioli and David Hasselhoff sang it in the key of E.

Translations
The song was translated to various languages in the foreign productions of Jekyll & Hyde, including Chinese, Finnish, Hungarian, Portuguese, Korean, Japanese, German, Swedish, and Spanish. It was also covered by Garry Hagger in Dutch as "Het mooiste moment".

Cover versions
The Moody Blues covered the song for Soccer Rocks the Globe, the official compilation album for the 1994 FIFA World Cup. Their version was later published on the compilation album Time Traveller.
Michael Ball also covered the song in 2005. 
Erik Santos covered the song when he won Search for the Star in a Million in 2004.

References

External links
 
 The Official Jekyll & Hyde website
 Official website of Frank Wildhorn
 New York Times review 

1990 songs
1997 singles
Songs from musicals